The Bridgewater Memorial Arena was a 1,200-seat multi-purpose arena in Bridgewater, Nova Scotia.  It was home to the Bridgewater Lumberjacks ice hockey team of the Maritime Junior Hockey League.  The arena opened in 1949. In 2015, the town council voted to close the arena due to financial issues.

References

External links
History and pictures of venue

Bridgewater, Nova Scotia
Defunct indoor arenas in Canada
Sports venues in Nova Scotia